Mina La Casualidad is an abandoned mine and ghost town in Salta Province in northwestern Argentina.

Climate

Mina La Casualidad has a Tundra climate (Köppen ET). It is possibly the Argentine settlement with the lowest annual precipitation.

See also
Salar de Arizaro
Salta–Antofagasta railway

References

Populated places in Salta Province